African Peoples Union (in French: Union des Populations Africaines) is a political party in Cameroon led by the Panafrican scholar Hubert Kamgang. The party was founded in 1996.

UPA is Panafrican and supports the creation of a 'United States of Africa'.

Political parties in Cameroon
Pan-Africanist political parties in Africa